Edmund Milton Holland (September 7, 1848 – November 24, 1913) was an American comedian.

Biography
He was born in New York City on September 7, 1848, the son of well-known English American stage actor George Holland. He appeared upon the stage in childhood, but his regular professional career began in 1866 at Barnum's Museum.  The next year, under the name of Mr. E. Milton, he became a member of Wallack's company, with which he played successfully in The Road to Ruin, Caste, and other pieces until 1880.  After an interval, during which he made a tour in England, he was engaged in 1882 at the Madison Square Theatre.  Among his characters in the years that followed were:  
 Pittacus Green in Hazel Kirke  
 Old Rogers in Esmerelda  
 Captain Redwood in Jim the Penman  
 Lot Burden in Saints and Sinners  
 Colonel Carter in Colonel Carter of Cartersville, at Palmer's Theatre

Beginning in 1895, he and his brother Joseph starred for two years in A Social Highwayman and other plays.  In 1901–02 he played the title rôle in Eben Holden, and from 1903 to 1906 he played Captain Bedford in Raffles.  In 1909 he joined the New Theatre Company, of which he remained a member till 1911, playing, among other parts:  
 Sir Oliver Surface in The School for Scandal  
 Canon Bonington in Don  
 Mr. Elkin in The Thunderbolt  
 Gaffer Tyl in The Blue Bird  
 Baron Von Haugh in Old Heidelberg

He appeared as Metz in Years of Discretion at the Belasco Theatre in 1912.

Holland was married to actress Emity Seward. Their daughter, Edna, was an actress. They also had a son.

He died in Cleveland, Ohio on November 24, 1913, of heart disease.

References

Male actors from New York City
1848 births
1913 deaths
American male comedians
American male stage actors
Vaudeville performers
The Lambs presidents
Comedians from New York City